George Goodwin Fiall (born April 25, 1900 - April 12, 1936) was a Negro leagues infielder who played for several teams, most of the seasons for the Lincoln Giants and Harrisburg Giants.  He was also on the great basketball team, the New York Renaissance Five.

The younger brother of fellow-Negro leaguer Tom Fiall, Fiall died at the age of 35 in New York, New York from pneumonia. He is buried at the Beverly Hills Cemetery in Peekskill, New York.

References

External links
 and Baseball-Reference Black Baseball stats and Seamheads

Lincoln Giants players
Baltimore Black Sox players
Brooklyn Royal Giants players
Birmingham Black Barons players
Harrisburg Giants players
Sportspeople from Charleston, South Carolina
1900 births
1936 deaths
20th-century African-American sportspeople
Deaths from pneumonia in New York City